James Clemens (fl. 1750–1775) was a Liverpool, England merchant and shipowner, and Lord Mayor of Liverpool.

Life
Clemens made three voyages to Angola in the 1750s, in addition to other slave runs, in 1767 he sent the Ranger under William Speers to acquire slaves in Angola and take them to Barbados.  Also in 1767 he became a member of the town council of Liverpool, and was, from 1775 to 1776, the Lord Mayor.  While Lord Mayor he presented St Pauls, Stoneycroft with a two cwt (104 kg) bell.

References

External links
 Touhy papers

English merchants
18th-century English people
People from Liverpool
English slave traders